This is a list of Tagalog literary works.

Notable literary works
Manga Panalanging Pagtatagobilin sa Caloloua nang Tauong Naghihingalo by Gaspar Aquino de Belen, 1703
Florante at Laura (Florante and Laura) by Francisco Balagtas, 1838
Urbana at Feliza (Urbana and Feliza) by Modesto de Castro, 1854
Banaag at Sikat (From Early Dawn to Full Light)" by Lope K. Santos, 1906
Ang Huling Timawa by Servando de Los Angeles, 1936
Kayumanggi at Iba Pang Mga Tula by Amado V. Hernandez, 1940
Timawa (Free Person/Slave) by Agustin Fabian, 1953
Luha ng Buwaya by Amado V. Hernandez, 1963
Sa Mga Kuko ng Liwanag (In the Claws of Brightness) by Edgardo M. Reyes, 1966–1967
Dekada '70 by Lualhati Bautista, 1983

Writers
Gaspar Aquino de Belen (fl. 1703)
Francisco Balagtas (1788-1862)
Lualhati Bautista (1945-2023)
José de la Cruz (1746-1829)
Agustin Fabian (1901-1976)
Lázaro A. Francisco (1898-1980)
Bienvenido Lumbera (1932-2021)
Rolando Tinio (1937-1997)
Jose Bernardino Capino
Rene O. Villanueva (1954-2007)

See also
Tagalog pocketbooks
Philippine literature for literatures of other languages of the Philippines

References

External links
Project Gutenberg of the Philippines
Tagalog-language texts at Project Gutenberg
100 Nobelang Tagalog

Tagalog-language novels